Vattetot-sur-Mer is a commune in the Seine-Maritime department in the Normandy region in northern France.

Geography
Imposing limestone cliffs look out onto the English Channel.

Population

Places of interest
 The church of St. Pierre, dating from the twelfth century.

See also
Communes of the Seine-Maritime department

References

Communes of Seine-Maritime
Populated coastal places in France